Ivan Hrvatska is a Croatian singer living in Canada, known for his songs about "making love" to national holidays of Canada and the United States. He first gained attention in 2001 with the song "First I Make Love to You, Then I Make Love to Christmas". Other tracks include "Making Love to the Grey Cup" and "Making Love to Vancouver Canucks".

His album Seasons of Love (Party All Year) charted on Canadian college album charts, including reaching #3 in Winnipeg.

In 2010 Ivan Hrvatska was in the Croatian reality TV show Farma on Nova TV.

Discography

Albums
 Seasons of Love (Party All Year), iTunes release March 2006
 Hrvatski Party! (Translation: Croatian Party), iTunes release June 2008
 Vrijeme za Party (Translation: It is time for Party), iTunes release March 2009
 Muzika za Party (Translation: Music for the Party), iTunes release March 2010

References

External links
 

Canadian male singers
Musicians from Vancouver
Living people
Canadian comedy musicians
Canadian people of Croatian descent
Year of birth missing (living people)
Comedians from British Columbia